In methodology, the power of a method is inversely proportional to the generality of the method, i.e.: the more specific the method, the more powerful.

Examples
rather general (not very powerful)
 the exception proves the rule;
 blame your predecessor;
 when in doubt, cut it out;
 to understand something is to stand under it;
 false dichotomy, as "there are two kinds of people in the world"

somewhat specific
 find, then control key variables to make an experiment reproducible.
 make hypotheses, then try to disprove them;
 form a question, the answer to which will divide the problem space into two subspaces of about equal size;
 Occam's razor: all else being equal, the more likely hypothesis is the one with fewer assumptions;
 measure with micrometer, mark with chalk, cut with axe;

very specific (very powerful)
 confirm presence of blood with luminol;

See also
 Gödel's incompleteness theorems
 Holism
 Reductionism

References

 Concept of Method, Justus Buchler (1985)

External links
 http://www.scientificmethod.com/p_master.html

Methodology